MITV may refer to:

 CIHF-TV or Maritimes Independent Television, a former Canadian TV station
 Murhi International Television, a Nigerian TV station
 MiTV, a pay-TV service offered in Malaysia
 Myanmar International, a Burmese state-owned national and international English-language television channel
 More Issues Than Vogue, K. Michelle's third studio album
 Xiaomi TV, also known as MiTV, a smart TV designed and marketed by Xiaomi